All Disco Dance Must End in Broken Bones is the second and final studio album by Swedish band Whale, released in 1998. It peaked at #13 on the weekly charts in its native Sweden, with the single "Four Big Speakers" reaching #50.

Track listing

 "Crying at Airports" – 5:22
 "Deliver the Juice" – 5:11
 "Roadkill" – 4:17
 "Smoke" – 5:25
 "Losing CTRL" – 4:12
 "Four Big Speakers" – 3:52
 "Go Where You’re Feeling Free" – 5:09
 "Into the Strobe" – 6:09
 "Puma Gym" – 2:51
 "No Better" – 4:19
 "2 Cord Song" – 7:19

References 

1998 albums
Whale (band) albums
Virgin Records albums
Albums produced by Brad Wood
Albums produced by Chris Potter (record producer)